A LANMeter was a tool for testing Token Ring and Ethernet networks introduced by Fluke Corporation in 1993.  It incorporated hardware testing (cable and network interface card) and active network testing in a handheld, battery operated package.  It was discontinued in 2003.

Variants 

Computer network analysis